The kira is the national dress for women in Bhutan. It is an ankle-length dress consisting of a rectangular piece of woven fabric. It is wrapped and folded around the body and is pinned at both shoulders, usually with silver brooches (named koma), and bound at the waist with a long belt. The kira is usually worn with a wonju (long-sleeved blouse) inside and a short jacket or toego outside.

A rachu (narrow embroidered cloth draped over the left shoulder) is worn over the traditional dress kira.

See also
 Kho
 Chuba
 Toego
 Wonju
 Pathin
 Phasinh
 Rigwnai
 Gho

References

Folk costumes
Bhutanese clothing